Jake Gaither Gymnasium is a 3,365-seat multi-purpose arena in Tallahassee, Florida. It was built in 1963 and was home to the Florida A&M University Rattlers basketball team until 2008. It is named for Jake Gaither, head football coach at Florida A&M University from 1945 until 1969. In November 2009, the Rattlers Men's and Women's Basketball teams as well as the Women's Volleyball team moved into the Senator Al Lawson Multi Purpose Teaching Gymnasium, across the street from Gaither Gym.

References

Defunct college basketball venues in the United States
Indoor arenas in Florida
Sports venues in Tallahassee, Florida
College basketball venues in the United States
Florida A&M Rattlers basketball
1963 establishments in Florida
Sports venues completed in 1963